Jean-Philippe Douin (8 April 1940 – 19 January 2016) was a French Air Force general. He was the Chief of Staff of the French Air Force from 1994 to 1995 and Chief of the Defence Staff from 1995 to 1998. There was some controversy surrounding his appointment since, as a Conscript between 1958 and 1959, he had served in a French Marine Light Cavalry/Light Armored Reconnaissance Regiment (Régiment d'infanterie-chars de marine) in Algeria that was accused of committing war crimes during the Algerian War; later, as a young Air Force Lieutenant and Dassault Mirage III fighter pilot in 1961, his unit had taken part in the Algiers Putsch under the command of Air Vice Marashal Jouhaud. For most of his flying career, Douin piloted the Dassault Mirage III and the Dassault Mirage 5, commanding a squadron, wing and fighter group, before becoming the French Air Attache to Pakistan and Chile. After entering the General Ranks he served variously as a doctrinal specialist in the Air Force Staff & Training Command, the chief of Aerial Intelligence for a Fighter Division, and Commander of a Fighter Division.

References

External links
NATO - Chief of Staff of France

1940 births
2016 deaths
French Air Force generals
Chiefs of the Staff of the French Air and Space Force
Grand Chanceliers of the Légion d'honneur
Grand Croix of the Légion d'honneur
Grand Cross of the Ordre national du Mérite
Recipients of the Aeronautical Medal
Commanders of the Order of Agricultural Merit
Commandeurs of the Ordre des Arts et des Lettres
Commanders of the Legion of Merit
Commanders of the Order of the White Lion
Commanders First Class of the Order of the Polar Star
Commanders Crosses of the Order of Merit of the Federal Republic of Germany
Recipients of orders, decorations, and medals of Senegal